The Marshall News Messenger (originally the Marshall Morning News)  is a daily newspaper based in Marshall, Texas, with a circulation of around 5,000 in the Marshall area.

Cox Enterprises sold the newspaper to ASP Westward in 2009. In 2012, ASP announced the sale of the Marshall and Longview papers, along with 12 of its other non-daily East Texas papers, to Texas Community Media LLC, a new company formed by the longtime owners of the Victoria Advocate in South Texas.

There have been three newspapers based in Marshall, Texas: the Texas Republican (1849–1872), the Tri-Weekly Herald (1874), and the current Marshall News Messenger (originally the Marshall Morning News).

The Marshall Morning News was founded in 1919, with the first issue appearing September 7. It was founded by Homer Price and Bryan Blalock.

Several notable people began careers at The Marshall News Messenger: Bill Moyers began his journalism career at age sixteen as a cub reporter, and popular Texas radio talk show host, Mattie Dellinger, had her first job in journalism there in 1953.

The Texas Republican and the Tri-Weekly Herald, both published by Robert W. Loughery, were credited with aiding the election of Marshall citizens J.P. Henderson, Edward Clark, and Pendleton Murrah to the Governor's office and Louis T. Wigfall to the U.S. Senate.

In the Texas Republican, Loughery defended slavery and plantation agriculture and supported the secession of Texas and later the Confederacy. The election of local citizens and the fiery pro-confederate stance of the Texas Republican made it one of the most-read papers in Texas and made Marshall a major political center in Antebellum Texas.

References

Daily newspapers published in Texas